R J High School (Deo) full name Raja Jagannath High School, Deo is a government boys high school, it is a Board and Intermediate of Education school and college situated in Deo, Bihar, India. It was established in 1938. The college,  approved by Bihar School Examination Board for Board (10th) and Intermediate (12th), and the Ministry of Human Resource Development.

Alumni
 Rajan Singh

See also
 R.B.K. Project High School (Deo)
 List of teacher education schools in India

References

External links

Deo, Bihar
Schools in Deo, Bihar
1938 establishments in India
Educational institutions established in 1938